The Aeros Vitamin is a Ukrainian single-place, paraglider, designed and produced by Aeros of Kyiv.

Design and development
The Vitamin was intended as a beginner paraglider for flight training and local flying. Some sizes were AFNOR certified as "standard".  The Vitamin variant number indicates the wing area in square metres. The original Vitamin design was in production in 2003 in sizes 27, 30 and 32, but is no longer available, having been replaced by the improved Vitamin 2. The Vitamin 2 offers the same sizes, with the addition of the smaller 25 for lighter pilots.

The Vitamin 2 is constructed from Gelvenor OLKS fabric for the wing's top surface and Porcher Skytex medium finish for the bottom surface, with the ribs made from Porcher Skytex hard finish. The lines are made from Cousin Trestec Aramide.

Variants
Vitamin 27
Vitamin 30
Vitamin 32
AFNOR certified.
Vitamin 2 25
Vitamin 2 27
AFNOR certified.
Vitamin 2 30
AFNOR certified.
Vitamin 2 32
AFNOR certified.

Specifications (Vitamin 27)

References

External links

Official website

Paragliders
Vitamin